Objects in the Mirror Are Closer Than They Appear is the only studio album by American rap rock supergroup Confrontation Camp. It was released on July 25, 2000 via Artemis Records. Production was handled by all the three members Professor Griff, Chuck D and Kyle Jason. The title is derived from the US safety warning for convex side mirrors in vehicles, "Objects in mirror are closer than they appear".

Track listing

Personnel
Confrontation Camp
Kyle Jason — vocals, guitar, programming
Richard "Professor Griff" Griffin — rap vocals, programming
Carlton "Mistachuck" Ridenhour — rap vocals

Chaingang
Brian Hardgroove — bass guitar
Jafar A. Mahmud — guitar
Wes Little — drums
DJ Lord Aswod — turntables

Additional musicians
Stian Lorentzen — guitar

References

2000 debut albums
Artemis Records albums
Confrontation Camp albums